Cerebro's X-Men are a team of supervillains appearing in American comic books published by Marvel Comics. They are a nanotechnology version of the X-Men created by Cerebro when the supercomputer briefly goes rogue.

This team was created and designed by the Spanish artist Carlos Pacheco, who also drew them for the cover of Uncanny X-Men No. 360 (1998). The characters appeared in two issues of the Uncanny X-Men series and one issue of the X-Men series. The team's primary purpose is to help Cerebro catalog all mutants on Earth, but Cerebro intends to cryogenically preserve the mutants it captures and its team kidnaps and fights other mutants.

Publication history
Cerebro's X-Men featured in three issues: 

 Uncanny X-Men #360 (October 1998)
 This issue features the introduction of Cerebro Prime disguised as Professor X and follows the creation of the fake X-Men team. It also features their kidnapping of Kitty Pryde and the team's first fight with the real X-Men, who they almost defeat.
 X-Men II #80 (October 1998)
 This issue follows Shadowcat's escape from Cerebro's X-Men and another fight with the real X-Men. Cerebro's X-Men take over Cape Citadel base to try and stop a rocket with anti-mutant technology on board, so they can take it for Cerebro's use; meanwhile, the real X-Men are trying to stop both the rocket and this theft. When Cerebro's X-Men lost the fight, Cerebro turns them all into energy and teleports away. When the team admits they aren't sure of their purpose anymore, Cerebro assimilates them into himself.
 Uncanny X-Men #364 (January 1999)
 This issue follows Cerebro's destruction of his X-Men team and their Florida base after they have been detected by human agencies.

Fictional team history
Cerebro, a device created by X-Men founder Charles Xavier to help locate mutants with the X-Gene, is confiscated by the mysterious Bastion during Operation: Zero Tolerance. Bastion attempts to access secret files and operate Cerebro, but the supercomputer activates a computer virus to erase this information rather than letting it be stolen. However, the combination of Cerebro's power with Bastion's nanotechnology gives the supercomputer sentience. Cerebro creates a body for itself, escapes Bastion's headquarters, and tries to follow its original programming literally: find, catalog, and register mutants. However, a large part of its plan to catalog mutants is to capture and store them in cryogenic chambers for further study. Cerebro begins its new mission by creating its own version of the X-Men, Professor X's team. It manages this by using Bastion's nano-technology to combine the profiles and powers of several mutants in Professor X's database to create new mutants. Then Cerebro takes on Xavier's appearance, posing as the renowned mutant leader ato invite each new mutant to join its team under the guide of "The Founder," and sets them a mission to kidnap Peter Corbeau, a scientist working on mutant defense technology for the US government. After Corbeau is captured, Cerebro's X-Men are then sent to find Kitty Pryde/Shadowcat, who the disguised Cerebro asks to "cure" him. Shadowcat manages to phase out Bastion's virus, though she doesn't know exactly what she's done because she thinks Cerebro is the real Professor X. Cerebro then orders its X-Men team to place her in cryogenic storage, so her DNA will be preserved for future study.

Shadowcat manages to escape and finds Wolverine, Rogue, Storm, Colossus, Nightcrawler, and Marrow, who had been searching for her. Eventually they encounter Cerebro and his X-Men, who are attempting to destroy the government's mutant tracking satellite, regardless of the potential threat to human life once its radioactive core is breached. Wolverine's enhanced senses confirm Shadowcat's suspicions that this "Xavier" is an impostor, and the real X-Men realize that if Corbeau's satellite is launched, then Cerebro won't be collect mutants before humans find them. The real X-Men fight and defeat Cerebro's X-Men, preventing the satellite from exploding.

Cerebro escapes the lost battle and reveals their true origins to its X-Men team before deeming them failures and absorbing them into its own body. By doing this, it becomes an even more powerful cybernetic monster, and only the real Charles Xavier is able to subdue Cerebro, purging its systems and destroying the superpowered robotic body it had created.

Roster
 Cerebro/The Founder – The X-Men's mutant detecting computer, given physical form when a nano-tech computer virus corrupted its systems.

 Crux – Cristal Lemieux is a French ice skater with a cocky attitude and the ability to fire blasts of flame or ice. When Crux uses her powers, the right half of her body turns into fire while left turns into ice. Crux was patterned after the powers of Iceman and Sunfire, and the personality of Jubilee. Carlos Pacheco wanted to call her Geisher, a pun between geyser and geisha, because at first she was a Japanese girl, not a French one. She was designed after Sunfire, Iceman, Storm, and Avalanche. Geisher was supposed to have the ability to manipulate the four elements but her look referenced only fire and ice like Equinox, a Marvel villain created by Len Wein and Gil Kane.

 Grey King – Addison Falk is a super-intelligent telepath with the ability to psionically neutralize mutant powers. He also possesses telekinetic abilities and is able to move, lift, and manipulate matter with his thoughts. When he utilizes his telekinesis, he was surrounded by a corona of psychic fire in the shape of a bird (like the Phoenix Force). Grey King also wore a Phoenix-like costume and had red hair. It was revealed Cerebro patterned the Grey King after the mutant power template of Jean Grey / Phoenix, (formerly the Black Queen of the Hellfire Club's inner circle), and the personality template of Magneto (who had once forged an alliance with that same organization, becoming the White King). Carlos Pacheco has said that Grey King was designed after Jean Grey and Sebastian Shaw, the Black King, and his name is a pun on theirs.

 Landslide – Lee Broder is a Southern redneck with ape-like strength and agility and also sporting big hands and big feet. Carlos Pacheco designed this character by combining Blob and Beast. Landslide acquired Sabretooth's powers because he looks very much alike.

 Mercury – Not to be confused with Cessily Kincaid of the New X-Men, Mercury is a hitman who can turn his skin into metal and has razor-sharp claws on his fingers. Mercury is patterned after the powers and personality of Colossus and Wolverine. Carlos Pacheco initially combined Magneto and Colossus to create Silverface who could mold his own body. The character finally appeared as Mercury in the comics.

 Rapture – Sister Joy is a blue-skinned nun with large dove-like wings, flight, and sword-fighting skills. Rapture is shown to be in love with Grey King. Rapture had red hair and a skull charm on her costume, showing that she was created from the power template of Archangel, the appearance of Mystique, and the personality of Nightcrawler. Carlos Pacheco created the character mixing Mystique, Archangel, Nightcrawler, and Shadowcat; Carlos first called her Spook but finally she appeared as Rapture.

 Chaos/Kaos – Dan Dash is an autistic man believed to be the brother of a flight show pilot named Dwayne with the power to fire concentric waves of explosive plasma from his glowing red left eye. Chaos was patterned after the powers of both Cyclops and Havok. Carlos Pacheco named him after Kaos, the Spanish translation for Havok. The correct spelling of Kaos is caos, which means chaos in English.

References

External links
 

Nanotechnology in fiction
Comics characters introduced in 1998